And Then Again is a jazz album by drummer Elvin Jones recorded in 1965 and released on the Atlantic label. 
 It features Jones in a sextet with his brothers Thad Jones on cornet and Hank Jones on piano, along with trombonist J.J. Johnson, baritone saxophonist Charles Davis and bassist Art Davis. Pianist Don Friedman and bassist Paul Chambers replace Hank and Art on three tracks, and saxophonist Frank Wess is added.

Track listing
 "Azan" (Charles Davis) - 3:38 
 "All Deliberate Speed" (Melba Liston) - 7:35 
 "Elvin Elpus" (Liston) - 5:52 
 "Soon After" (Jodora Marshall) - 3:35 
 "Forever Summer" (Thad Jones) - 4:04 
 "Len Sirrah" (Liston) - 3:42 
 "And Then Again" (Elvin Jones) - 6:21

Personnel 
 Elvin Jones - drums 
 Thad Jones - cornet (tracks 2, 3, 5 & 7)
 J.J. Johnson - trombone (tracks 1-6)
 Frank Wess - tenor saxophone, flute (tracks 1, 4 & 6)
 Charles Davis - baritone saxophone (tracks 1-6)
 Don Friedman - piano (tracks 1, 4 & 6)
 Hank Jones - piano (tracks 2, 3, 5 & 7)
 Paul Chambers - bass (tracks 1, 4 & 6)
 Art Davis - bass (tracks 2, 3, 5 & 7)
 Melba Liston - arranger, conductor (tracks 1-6)

References

Elvin Jones albums
1965 albums
Atlantic Records albums
Albums produced by Nesuhi Ertegun
Albums arranged by Melba Liston